The 2019 Oman Open is the second event of the 2019 ITTF Challenge Series. It takes place from 22–24 March in Muscat, Oman.Lin Yun-ju also claimed a triple crown.

Men's singles

Seeds

Draw

Top half

Section 1

Section 2

Bottom half

Section 3

Section 4

Finals

Women's singles

Seeds

Draw

Top half

Bottom half

Finals

Men's doubles

Seeds

Draw

Women's doubles

Seeds

Draw

Mixed doubles

Seeds

Draw

References

External links
 Tournament page on ITTF website

Oman Open
International sports competitions hosted by Oman
Oman Open (table tennis)
Oman Open